The jejunal veins drains the jejunum and are tributaries of the superior mesenteric vein.

External links

Veins of the torso